Jardim São Pedro is a neighbourhood (bairro) in the city of Porto Alegre, the state capital of Rio Grande do Sul, in Brazil. It was created by Law 2022 from December 7, 1959, but had its limits modified by Law 4249 from December 27, 1976.

External links
 Porto Alegre City Homepage

Neighbourhoods in Porto Alegre
Populated places established in 1959